Ruth Dorrit Yacoby (28 April 1952 – 5 November 2015) was an Israeli painter and poet.

Biography
Yacoby was born in the Galilee to Canadian- and Iraqi-born immigrants Hilda and Avraham Ezekiel, and was raised in Moshav Arbel. She married Giora Yacoby on completion of her service in the Artillery Corps in 1972, and the two moved to Beersheba in 1976. There, she studied behavioural sciences at Ben-Gurion University of the Negev and painting at the Visual Arts College. She went on to continue her artistic training at the Teachers Training College in Ramat Hasharon.

Her first solo exhibition, entitled "Woman on an Illuminated Table," was held at the Israel Museum in 1987. Yacoby's work has been since displayed at museums and galleries across Israel, as well as in Canada, Japan, Cuba, China, Thailand, Singapore, South Korea, Mexico, Peru, Argentina, Chile, and the Vatican.

She died of cancer on 5 November 2015.

References

1952 births
2015 deaths
Israeli people of Iraqi-Jewish descent
21st-century Israeli painters
Ben-Gurion University of the Negev alumni
Israeli women painters
Jewish Israeli artists
People from Arad, Israel